Banda Rito is the 17th and final studio album from the Filipino trio APO Hiking Society. The album has 10 tracks and was released under the Universal Records label. The tracks includes original compositions by different Filipino bands that gained prominence during the 1990s in the Philippines such as "Pare Ko" by The Eraserheads, "Harana" by Parokya ni Edgar, "Kisapmata" by Rivermaya, among others.

Track listing
 Paglisan* - 4:13 Lyrics & Music by: Mike Villegas
 Pare Ko - 4:56 Lyrics & Music by: Ely Buendia/Arranged by: Bond Samson/JD Villanueva
 Harana - 4:01 Lyrics & Music by: Eric Yaptangco/Arranged by: Jimmy Antiporda
 Pagsubok - 3:56 Lyrics & Music by: Naldy Padilla/John Ong/Arranged by: Jay Durias
 Ako'y Sa 'Yo, Ika'y Akin - 4:39 Lyrics & Music by: John Bunda, Jr./Arranged by: Lorrie Ilustre
 Karaniwang Tao - 2:49 Lyrics & Music by: Joey Ayala/Arranged by: Bob Aves
 Kisapmata - 4:06 Lyrics & Music by: Rico Blanco/Arranged by: Jimmy Antiporda
 Tag-ulan - 4:01 Lyrics & Music by: Wency Cornejo/Arranged by: Lorrie Ilustre
 Banal Na Aso - 4:21 Lyrics & Music by: Eric Gancio/Dong Abay/Arranged by: Mon David
 Magasin - 3:52 Lyrics & Music by: Ely Buendia/Arranged by: Bond Samson/JD Villanueva
 Minamahal Kong Pilipinas - 5:42 Lyrics & Music by: Jim Paredes/Arranged by: Ernie Baladjay

Paglisan appears as an unlisted, uncredited bonus track at the beginning of the disc on later CD pressings of the album, and is not included in the original track listing. It also appears uncredited track at the beginning and at the end of cassette release.

References

APO Hiking Society albums
2001 albums